Following is list of regional rural banks in Uttar Pradesh ,:

NOTE

 Amalgamation of Gramin Bank of Aryavart and Allahabad UP Gramin Bank in Aryavart Bank on 1 April 2019.
 Amalgamation of Prathama Bank and Sarva UP Gramin Bank in Prathama UP Gramin Bank on 1 April 2019.
 Amalgamation of Purvanchal Bank, Kashi Gomti Samyut Gramin Bank and Baroda UP Gramin Bank in Baroda UP Bank on 1 April 2020.

References

External links
List of Gramin Banks in India - status updated in 2018

Banks
 
Lists of banks in India